Miranew Square is a shopping mall located in Danhai New Town of Tamsui, New Taipei, Taiwan that opened on 26 February 2019. Main core stores of the mall include Miranew Danhai Cinemas and various themed restaurants.

Public transportation
The mall is located in close proximity to Kanding light rail station, which is served by the Danhai Light Rail.

See also
List of tourist attractions in Taiwan
Danhai New Town

References

External links
Official Website

2019 establishments in Taiwan
Shopping malls in New Taipei
Shopping malls established in 2019